Crossover is an album by former King Crimson violinist David Cross and former Yes guitarist Peter Banks. It is drawn largely from a single day of improvising by the duo that was polished later on.

Production
Cross and Banks performed a series of violin and guitar improvisations on the afternoon of 10 August 2010. The two had met on a joint tour in 2006, featuring the David Cross Band and Peter Banks's Harmony in Diversity. Banks passed away in 2013 and Cross could not bring himself to return to the recordings for some time. When he finally did, he worked with producer Tony Lowe to polish and complete the material. In 2018/19 they invited various musicians with connections to Yes (including Tony Kaye, Oliver Wakeman, Billy Sherwood and Geoff Downes) and King Crimson (including Pat Mastelotto and Jeremy Stacey) to "interpret the music as freely and creatively" as they wished.

Track listing

Personnel

David Cross – violin
Peter Banks – electric guitar, synthesizer guitar
Geoff Downes – keyboards (1)
Tony Kaye – Hammond B-3 organ (2, 7)
Oliver Wakeman – Rhodes electric piano (2, 3, 6), grand piano (2), Moog synthesizers (2, 6), synthesizer (3), strings (6), electric organ (6)
Tony Lowe – additional bass, keyboard and string parts
Billy Sherwood – bass guitar (2, 6)
Jeremy Stacey – drums (1, 7)
Jay Schellen – drums (2)
Pat Mastelotto – drums and electronics (6)
Randy Raine-Reusch – "world instruments" (3)
Andy Jackson – sound effects (4)

Production
Produced by Tony Lowe & David Cross
Adrian Benavides: sonic manipulation (6)
Mastered by Mike Pietrini
Artwork by Michael Inns

See also
List of 2020 albums

References

External links
 

2020 albums
Collaborative albums
David Cross (musician) albums
Peter Banks albums